Auquin Punta (possibly from Quechua Awkin Punta, awki prince; a mythical figure of the Andean culture; grandfather, -n a suffix, local Quechua punta peak; ridge; first, before, in front of,  Hispanicized spelling Auquin Punta) is an archaeological site with stone tombs (chullpa) in Peru located in the Huánuco Region, Huamalíes Province, Jacas Grande District.

See also 
 Miyu Pampa

References 

Archaeological sites in Peru
Archaeological sites in Huánuco Region
Tombs in Peru